A pizzeria is a restaurant focusing on pizza. As well as pizza, dishes at pizzerias can include kebab, salads and pasta.

Many pizzerias offer take-away, where the customer orders their food either in advance or at the restaurant and then takes the prepared food with them in pizza boxes to eat at another place. Some pizzerias even deliver food to the customer's home, where a courier transports the ordered food to the customer's outer door or to another agreed site, provided that the delivery address is within a suitable distance from the pizzeria. Pizzas can be transported by car, but in many countries pizza couriers deliver by bicycle or moped. The food can be ordered at the restaurant, by telephone, and in current times often also by Internet.

In Italy, pizza was traditionally food for the poor and thus contained few and cheap ingredients. As pizza became popular in the United States after World War II it became mostly a practical dish that was quick and easy to prepare, not so much food for the poor any more. Pizza was not especially expensive, but the number of ingredients increased and pizza was no longer made simply from cheap ingredients. Pizza became even more accessible when frozen pizzas and pizza delivery were invented.<ref name="hultman">Hultman, Henrik (2013): Liv och arbete i pizzabranschen, OCLC 940865578, accessed on 27 December 2021.</ref>

Popular pizzeria chains include Pizza Hut, Papa John's, Domino's Pizza, Pizza Express, Call a Pizza, Pizzataxi, Rax Buffet, Kotipizza and Rosso.

History

Probably the oldest pizzeria in the world to still operate to this day is Antica Pizzeria Port'Alba in Naples, Italy. The restaurant was founded in 1738 as a catering place for merchants, and was converted into a restaurant with tables, chairs and an upper floor in 1830.

One of the world's first pizzerias was founded in Naples by Raffaele Esposito in 1830. The restaurant, which continues to operate to this day, is nowadays named Pizzeria Brandi. The first pizza margherita was baked in 1889 with the colours of the flag of Italy in honour of queen Margherita of Savoy who visited the restaurant.

In the United States, sales of pizza started in 1905, when Gennaro Lombardi installed a pizza oven in his shop-café and started selling pizza slices.

The first pizzeria in Finland was restaurant Giovanni founded in Hamina in 1961 by Giovanni Tedeschi, which stayed in business until the early 1980s.Sorjonen, Heli: Pizzeria Finlandia, master's thesis in photographic arts, Aalto University 2012, p. 55. The next pizzeria founded in Finland was restaurant Adriano Bar founded by Adriano Vinciguerra in Lappeenranta in 1964.

Fast food

In the late 20th century the concept of fast food caused changes in the pizza sales. Food stands offering pizza al taglio'' (Italian for "pizza by the slice") started appearing in Italy, baking large rectangular pizza sold in small slices. These slices are seldom topped with more than two ingredients, not counting tomato and cheese.

Pizzerias owned by immigrants
In many European countries, such as Sweden, significantly many owners and employees of pizzerias come from an immigrant background. This high number of immigrants working in the restaurant business is not limited to Sweden but is found in most of the OECD countries.

In Sweden many pizzerias are owned by immigrants and operate as independent small-scale businesses. This business model started as soon as pizza was introduced to Sweden in the 1970s.

The sociologist Henrik Hultman has shown a number of reasons why immigrants from outside Europe end up or choose to work in the pizzeria business. Compared to other businesses, starting a small-scale pizzeria is relatively cheap and does not require special training. Immigrants with inadequate education and work experience background because of war or a difficult immigration process can choose the pizzeria business as a viable alternative, but also educated people can face long studies in order to get to practice their former profession in Sweden. Operating a pizzeria is a viable way to support oneself and one's family compared to the long-term investments necessary for studies. Many pizzeria owners come from a social background where entrepreneurship is highly valued and it is common for their parents to also have owned or worked at small-scale family businesses, for example as farmers or craftsmen. Linguistic difficulties can also have an effect and contact in the restaurant business through friends or countrymen allows for an easy start in the business. Manual jobs not requiring special training are not very common, so there are few alternatives.

References

External links
 The history of Pizzerias . Accessed on 30 June 2011.

Italian words and phrases